Deh-e Parviz may refer to:
 Deh-e Parviz, Hirmand
 Deh-e Parviz, Mirjaveh